was a Japanese football player.

Playing career
Yamada was born in Hiroshima on February 13, 1968. After graduating from Waseda University, he joined Yanmar Diesel in 1990. He played many matches in his first season with the team. In 1992, he moved to new club Shimizu S-Pulse. He played as left side back and the club won the 2nd place 1992 and 1993 J.League Cup. He retired end of 1995 season.

Coaching career
After retirement, Yamada started coaching career at Shimizu S-Pulse in 1996. He coached youth team until 1997. In 2000, he became a manager for new university, Fuji Tokoha University. In April 2013, the university was integrated into Tokoha University and he managed Tokoha University.

On April 8, 2013, Yamada died of liver cancer in Shizuoka at the age of 45.

Club statistics

References

External links

geocities.co.jp

1968 births
2013 deaths
Waseda University alumni
Association football people from Hiroshima Prefecture
Japanese footballers
Japan Soccer League players
J1 League players
Cerezo Osaka players
Shimizu S-Pulse players
Association football defenders